The 1999 American Le Mans Series season was the inaugural season of the IMSA American Le Mans Series, and is now recognised as the 29th season of the IMSA GT Championship.  It was a series for Le Mans Prototypes (LMP) and Grand Touring (GT) race cars divided into three classes: LMP, GTS, and GT.  It began March 20, 1999, and ended November 7, 1999, after eight races.

The American Le Mans Series officially replaced the dwindling IMSA GT Championship after the 1998 season.  The Automobile Club de l'Ouest (ACO), which organized the 24 Hours of Le Mans, allowed IMSA's owner Don Panoz to create a series closely modeled after the formula used at Le Mans.  The first official ACO-backed event had been held at the 1998 Petit Le Mans, which was part of the IMSA GT season but allowed ACO-spec cars to compete.  The success of the event allowed Panoz to form the American Le Mans Series, which continued until its merger with Grand-Am in 2013.

Schedule

Originally the season finale was supposed to be the Grand Prix of San Diego held on a 1.5 mile Road course at the former Naval Training Center. However, the season finale would eventually be moved to the Las Vegas Motor Speedway due to construction delays.

Season results
Overall winner in bold.

Teams Championship
Points are awarded to the top nineteen finishers in each class in the following order:
 25-21-19-17-15-14-13-12-11-10-...
Exception however for the 12 Hours of Sebring, which awarded in the following order:
 30-26-24-22-20-19-18-17-16-15-...

Teams only scored the points for their highest finishing entry in each race.

LMP Standings

GTS Standings

GT Standings

References

External links
 American Le Mans Series homepage
 IMSA Archived ALMS Results and Points

American Le Mans
American Le Mans
American Le Mans Series seasons